A graphene lens is an optical refraction device. Graphene's unique 2-D honeycomb contributes to its unique optical properties.

Graphene 
The honeycomb structure allows electrons to behave as massless quasiparticles known as Dirac fermions.  Graphene's optical conductivity properties are thus unobstructed by any material parameters, as represented by equation 1, where  is the electron charge,  is Planck's constant and  represents the universal conductance.
          (Equation 1)

 

This behavior is the result of an undoped graphene material at zero temperature (figure 1a).  In contrast to traditional semiconductors or metals (figure 1b); graphene's band gap is nearly nonexistent because the conducting and valence bands make contact (Figure 1a).  However, the band gap is tunable via doping and electrical gating, changing optical properties.  As a result of its tunable conductivity, graphene is suitable for various optical applications.

Applications

Photodetectors

Electrical gating and doping allows for adjustment of graphene's optical absorptivity. The application of electric fields transverse to staggered graphene bilayers generates a shift in Fermi energy and an artificial, non-zero band gap (equation 2 figure 1).

    (Equation 2)
where 
Dt = top electrical displacement field   
Db = bottom electrical displacement field

Varying δD above or below zero (δD=0 denotes non-gated, neutral bilayers) allows electrons to pass through the bilayer without altering the gating-induced band gap. As shown in Figure 2, varying the average displacement field, ▁D, alters the bilayer's absorption spectra. The optical tunability resulting from gating and electrostatic doping (also known as charge plasma doping) lends to the application of graphene as an ultra-broadband photodetector in lenses.

The graphene layers became electrically isolated and exhibited an average Fermi difference of 0.12eV when a current was passed through the bottom layer (Figure 3). When the photodetector is exposed to light, excited hot electrons transitioned from the top graphene layer to the bottom, a process promoted by the structural asymmetry of the insulating  barrier. As a consequence of the hot electron transition, the top layer accumulates positive charges and induces a photogating  effect on the lower graphene layer, which is measured as a change in current correlating with photon detection. Utilizing graphene both as a channel for charge transport and light absorption, the photodetectors ably detects the visible to mid-infrared spectrum. Nanometers thin and functional at room temperature, graphene photodetectors show promise in lens applications.

Fresnel zone plates

 

Fresnel zone plates are devices that focus light on a fixed point in space. These devices concentrate light reflected off a lens onto a singular point (Figure 4). Composed of a series of discs centered about an origin, Fresnel zone plates are manufactured using laser pulses, which embed voids into areflective lens.

Despite its weak reflectance (R = 0.25π2 α 2 at T = 1.3 × 10-4 K), graphene has utility as a lens for Fresnel zone plates.  Graphene lenses effectively concentrate light of ʎ = 850 nm onto a single point 120 um away from the Fresnel zone plate (figure 5).  Further investigation illustrates that the reflected intensity increases linearly with the number of graphene layers within the lens (Figure 6).

Transparent conductors

Optoelectronic components such as light-emitting diode (LED) displays, solar cells, and touchscreens require highly transparent materials with low sheet resistance, Rs.  For a thin film, the sheet resistance is given by Equation 3:

            (Equation 3)

A material with tunable thickness t and conductivity σ is suitable for optoelectronic applications if Rs is reasonably small. Graphene is such a material; the number of graphene layers that comprise the film can tune t and the inherent tunability of graphene's optical properties via doping or grating can tune sigma.  Figure 7 shows graphene's potential relative to other known transparent conductors.

 

The need for alternative transparent conductors is well documented. Semiconductor based transparent conductors such as doped indium oxides, zinc oxides, or tin oxides suffer from practical downfalls including rigorous processing requirements, prohibitive cost, sensitivity toward Ph, and brittle consistency. However, graphene does not suffer from these shortfalls.

References

Graphene
Lenses